

Events

Pre-1600
 296 – Pope Marcellinus begins his papacy.
 763 – The Byzantine army of emperor Constantine V defeats the Bulgarian forces in the Battle of Anchialus.
1422 – Battle of Arbedo between the duke of Milan and the Swiss cantons.
1521 – Spanish forces defeat a combined French and Navarrese army at the Battle of Noáin during the Spanish conquest of Iberian Navarre.
1559 – King Henry II of France is mortally wounded in a jousting match against Gabriel, comte de Montgomery.
1598 – The Spanish held Castillo San Felipe del Morro in San Juan, Puerto Rico having been besieged for fifteen days, surrenders to an English force under Sir George Clifford, Earl of Cumberland.

1601–1900
1632 – The University of Tartu is founded.
1651 – The Deluge: Khmelnytsky Uprising: The Battle of Berestechko ends with a Polish victory.
1688 – The Immortal Seven issue the Invitation to William, which would culminate in the Glorious Revolution.
1758 – Seven Years' War: Habsburg Austrian forces destroy a Prussian reinforcement and supply convoy in the Battle of Domstadtl, helping to expel Prussian King Frederick the Great from Moravia.
1794 – Northwest Indian War: Native American forces under Blue Jacket attack Fort Recovery.
1805 – Under An act to divide the Indiana Territory into two separate governments, adopted by the U.S. Congress on January 11, 1805, the Michigan Territory is organized.
1859 – French acrobat Charles Blondin crosses Niagara Falls on a tightrope.
1860 – The 1860 Oxford evolution debate at the Oxford University Museum of Natural History takes place.
1864 – U.S. President Abraham Lincoln grants Yosemite Valley to California for "public use, resort and recreation".
1882 – Charles J. Guiteau is hanged in Washington, D.C. for the assassination of U.S. President James Garfield.
1886 – The first transcontinental train trip across Canada departs from Montreal, Quebec. It arrives in Port Moody, British Columbia on July 4.
1892 – The Homestead Strike begins near Pittsburgh, Pennsylvania.
1900 – A savage fire wrecked three steamships docked at a pier in Hoboken, New Jersey. Over 200 crew members and passengers are killed, and hundreds injured.

1901–present
1905 – Albert Einstein sends the article On the Electrodynamics of Moving Bodies, in which he introduces special relativity, for publication in Annalen der Physik.
1906 – The United States Congress passes the Meat Inspection Act and Pure Food and Drug Act.
1908 – The Tunguska Event, the largest impact event on Earth in human recorded history, resulting in a massive explosion over Eastern Siberia.
1912 – The Regina Cyclone, Canada's deadliest tornado event, kills 28 people in Regina, Saskatchewan.  
1916 – World War I: In "the day Sussex died", elements of the Royal Sussex Regiment take heavy casualties in the Battle of the Boar's Head at Richebourg-l'Avoué in France.
1921 – U.S. President Warren G. Harding appoints former President William Howard Taft as Chief Justice of the United States.
1922 – In Washington D.C., U.S. Secretary of State Charles Evans Hughes and Dominican Ambassador Francisco J. Peynado sign the Hughes–Peynado agreement, which ends the United States occupation of the Dominican Republic.
1934 – The Night of the Long Knives, Adolf Hitler's violent purge of his political rivals in Germany, takes place.
1936 – Emperor Haile Selassie of Abyssinia appeals for aid to the League of Nations against Italy's invasion of his country.
1937 – The world's first emergency telephone number, 999, is introduced in London.
1944 – World War II: The Battle of Cherbourg ends with the fall of the strategically valuable port to American forces.
1953 – The first Chevrolet Corvette rolls off the assembly line in Flint, Michigan.
1956 – A TWA Super Constellation and a United Airlines DC-7 collide above the Grand Canyon in Arizona and crash, killing all 128 on board both airliners.
1959 – A United States Air Force F-100 Super Sabre from Kadena Air Base, Okinawa, crashes into a nearby elementary school, killing 11 students plus six residents from the local neighborhood.
1960 – Belgian Congo gains independence as Republic of the Congo (Léopoldville).
1963 – Ciaculli bombing: a car bomb, intended for Mafia boss Salvatore Greco, kills seven police officers and military personnel near Palermo.
1966 – The National Organization for Women, the United States' largest feminist organization, is founded.
1968 – Pope Paul VI issues the Credo of the People of God.
1971 – The crew of the Soviet Soyuz 11 spacecraft are killed when their air supply escapes through a faulty valve.
1972 – The first leap second is added to the UTC time system.
1974 – The Baltimore municipal strike of 1974 begins.
1977 – The Southeast Asia Treaty Organization disbands.
1985 – Thirty-nine American hostages from the hijacked TWA Flight 847 are freed in Beirut after being held for 17 days.
1986 – The U.S. Supreme Court rules in Bowers v. Hardwick that states can outlaw homosexual acts between consenting adults.
1989 – A coup d'état in Sudan deposes the democratically elected government of Prime Minister Sadiq al-Mahdi and President Ahmed al-Mirghani.
1990 – East Germany and West Germany merge their economies.
1994 – During a test flight of an Airbus A330-300 at Toulouse–Blagnac Airport, the aircraft crashes killing all seven people on board.
2007 – A Jeep Cherokee filled with propane canisters drives into the entrance of Glasgow Airport, Scotland in a failed terrorist attack. This was linked to the 2007 London car bombs that had taken place the day before.
2009 – Yemenia Flight 626, an Airbus A310-300, crashes into the Indian Ocean near Comoros, killing 152 of the 153 people on board. A 14-year-old girl named Bahia Bakari survives the crash.
2013 – Nineteen firefighters die controlling a wildfire near Yarnell, Arizona.
  2013   – Protests begin around Egypt against President Mohamed Morsi and the ruling Freedom and Justice Party, leading to their overthrow during the 2013 Egyptian coup d'état.
2015 – A Hercules C-130 military aircraft with 113 people on board crashes in a residential area in Medan, Indonesia, resulting in at least 116 deaths.
2019 – Donald Trump becomes the first sitting US President to visit the Democratic People's Republic of Korea (North Korea).
2021 – The Tiger Fire ignites near Black Canyon City, Arizona, and goes on to burn  of land before being fully contained on July 30.

Births

Pre-1600
1286 – John de Warenne, 7th Earl of Surrey, English magnate (d. 1347)
1468 – John, Elector of Saxony (d. 1532)
1470 – Charles VIII of France (d. 1498)
1478 – John, Prince of Asturias, Son of Ferdinand II of Aragon and Isabella I of Castile (d. 1497)
1503 – John Frederick I, Elector of Saxony (d. 1554)
1533 – Martín de Rada, Spanish missionary (d. 1578)
1588 – Giovanni Maria Sabino, Italian organist, composer, and educator (d. 1649)

1601–1900
1641 – Meinhardt Schomberg, 3rd Duke of Schomberg, German-English general (d. 1719)
1685 – John Gay, English poet and playwright (d. 1732)
1688 – Abu l-Hasan Ali I, ruler of Tunisia (d. 1756)
1722 – Jiří Antonín Benda, Czech composer, violinist and Kapellmeister (d. 1795)
1755 – Paul Barras, French soldier and politician (d. 1829)
1789 – Horace Vernet, French painter and academic (d. 1863)
1791 – Félix Savart, French physicist and psychologist (d. 1841) 
1803 – Thomas Lovell Beddoes, English poet, playwright, and physician (d. 1849)
1807 – Friedrich Theodor Vischer, German author, poet, and playwright (d.1887)
1817 – Joseph Dalton Hooker, English botanist and explorer (d. 1911)
1843 – Ernest Mason Satow, English orientalist and diplomat (d. 1929)
1864 – Frederick Bligh Bond, English architect and archaeologist (d. 1945)
1884 – Georges Duhamel, French author and critic (d. 1966)
1889 – Archibald Frazer-Nash, English motor car designer, engineer and founder of Frazer Nash (d. 1965) 
1890 – Paul Boffa, Maltese physician and politician, 5th Prime Minister of Malta (d. 1962)
1891 – Man Mountain Dean, American wrestler and sergeant (d. 1953)
  1891   – Ed Lewis, American wrestler and manager (d. 1966)
  1891   – Stanley Spencer, English painter (d. 1959)
1892 – Pierre Blanchar, Algerian-French actor and director (d. 1963)
1893 – Nellah Massey Bailey, American politician and librarian (d. 1956)
  1893   – Walter Ulbricht, German soldier and politician (d. 1973)
1895 – Heinz Warneke, German-American sculptor and educator (d. 1983)
1899 – Madge Bellamy, American actress (d. 1990)

1901–present
1905 – John Van Ryn, American tennis player (d. 1999)
1906 – Anthony Mann, American actor and director (d. 1967)
1907 – Roman Shukhevych, Ukrainian general and politician (d. 1950)
1908 – Winston Graham, English author (d. 2003)
  1908   – Luigi Rovere, Italian film producer (d. 1996)
  1908   – Rob Nieuwenhuys, Dutch writer (d. 1999)
1909 – Juan Bosch, 43rd President of the Dominican Republic (d. 2001)
1911 – Czesław Miłosz, Polish novelist, essayist, and poet, Nobel Prize laureate (d. 2004)
  1911   – Nagarjun, Indian poet (d. 1998)
1912 – Ludwig Bölkow, German engineer (d. 2003)
  1912   – Dan Reeves, American businessman and philanthropist (d. 1971)
  1912   – María Luisa Dehesa Gómez Farías, Mexican architect (d. 2009)
1913 – Alfonso López Michelsen, Colombian lawyer and politician, 24th President of Colombia (d. 2007)
  1913   – Harry Wismer, American sportscaster (d. 1967)
1914 – Francisco da Costa Gomes, Portuguese general and politician, 15th President of Portugal (d. 2001)
  1914   – Allan Houser, American sculptor and painter (d. 1994)
1917 – Susan Hayward, American actress (d. 1975)
  1917   – Lena Horne, American actress, singer, and activist (d. 2010)
  1917   – Willa Kim, American costume designer (d. 2016)
1919 – Ed Yost, American inventor of the modern hot air balloon (d. 2007)
1920 – Eleanor Ross Taylor, American poet and educator (d. 2011)
1921 – Washington SyCip, American-Filipino accountant (d. 2017)
1923 – Andy Jack, English footballer
1924 – Max Trepp, Swiss sprinter (d. 1990)
1925 – Fred Schaus, American basketball player and coach (d. 2010)
  1925   – Ebrahim Amini, Iranian politician (d. 2020)
1926 – Paul Berg, American biochemist and academic, Nobel Prize laureate (d. 2023)
  1926   – David Berglas, American magician and mentalist 
1927 – Shirley Fry Irvin, American tennis player (d. 2021)
  1927   – James Goldman, American screenwriter and playwright (d. 1998)
  1927   – Mario Lanfranchi, Italian director, screenwriter, producer, collector and actor (d. 2022)
  1927   – Frank McCabe, American basketball player (d. 2021)
1928 – Hassan Hassanzadeh Amoli, Islamic philosopher, theologian, mathematician and mystic (d. 2021)
  1928   – Nathaniel Tarn, American poet, essayist, anthropologist, and translator
1929 – Yang Ti-liang, Chinese judge
1930 – Ben Atchley, American politician (d. 2018)
  1930   – Ahmed Zaki Yamani, Saudi Arabian politician (d. 2021)
  1930   – Ignatius Peter VIII Abdalahad, Syrian bishop (d. 2018)
1931 – Yo-Yo Davalillo, Venezuelan baseball player and manager (d. 2013)
  1931   – Andrew Hill, American pianist and composer (d. 2007)
  1931   – Ronald Rene Lagueux, American judge
  1931   – Kaye Vaughan, American football player
1933 – Tomislav Ivić, Croatian football coach and manager (d. 2011)
  1933   – M. J. K. Smith, English cricketer and rugby player
  1933   – Orval Tessier, Canadian ice hockey player and coach (d. 2022)
  1933   – Joan Murrell Owens, American educator and marine biologist (d. 2011)
1934 – Harry Blackstone Jr., American magician and author (d. 1997)
1935 – John Harlin, American pilot and mountaineer (d. 1966)
1936 – Assia Djebar, Algerian-French author and translator (d. 2015)
  1936   – Nancy Dussault, American actress and singer 
  1936   – Tony Musante, American actor and screenwriter (d. 2013)
  1936   – Dave Van Ronk, American singer-songwriter and guitarist (d. 2002)
1937 – Larry Henley, American singer-songwriter (d. 2014)
1938 – Billy Mills, American sprinter
1939 – Tony Hatch, English pianist, composer, and producer
  1939   – Barry Hines, English author and screenwriter (d. 2016)
  1939   – José Emilio Pacheco, Mexican poet and author (d. 2014)
1940 – Mark Spoelstra, American singer-songwriter and guitarist (d. 2007)
1941 – Peter Pollock, South African cricketer and author
1942 – Robert Ballard, American lieutenant and oceanographer
  1942   – Ron Harris, Canadian ice hockey player and coach
1943 – Florence Ballard, American pop/soul singer (d. 1976) 
  1943   – Saeed Akhtar Mirza, Indian director and screenwriter
1944 – Raymond Moody, American parapsychologist and author
  1944   – Glenn Shorrock, English-Australian singer-songwriter 
  1944   – Ron Swoboda, American baseball player and sportscaster
1949 – Uwe Kliemann, German footballer, coach, and manager
  1949   – Andy Scott, Welsh singer-songwriter, guitarist, and producer
  1949   – Bùi Thanh Liêm, Vietnamese cosmonaut (d. 1981)
1951 – Stanley Clarke, American bass player and composer 
1952 – Athanassios S. Fokas, Greek mathematician and academic
  1952   – David Garrison, American actor and singer
1953 – Hal Lindes, American-English guitarist and film score composer
1954 – Stephen Barlow, English organist, composer, and conductor
  1954   – Pierre Charles, Dominican educator and politician, 5th Prime Minister of Dominica (d. 2004)
  1954   – Serzh Sargsyan, Armenian politician, 3rd President of Armenia
  1954   – Wayne Swan, Australian academic and politician, 14th Deputy Prime Minister of Australia
1955 – Brian Vollmer, Canadian singer
  1955   – Egils Levits, Latvian judge, jurist, 10th President of Latvia
1956 – Volker Beck, German hurdler and coach
  1956   – David Lidington, English historian, academic, and politician, Minister of State for Europe
  1956   – David Alan Grier, American actor, singer, and comedian
1957 – Bud Black, American baseball player and manager
  1957   – Sterling Marlin, American race car driver
1958 – Pam Royle, British television presenter, journalist and voice coach
  1958   – Esa-Pekka Salonen, Finnish conductor and composer
1959 – Vincent D'Onofrio, American actor
  1959   – Daniel Goldhagen, American political scientist, author, and academic
  1959   – Brendan Perry, English singer-songwriter, guitarist, and producer 
  1959   – Sakis Tsiolis, Greek footballer and manager
  1959   – Sandip Verma, Baroness Verma, Indian-English businesswoman and politician
1960 – Jack McConnell, Scottish educator and politician, 3rd First Minister of Scotland
  1960   – Murray Cook, Australian musician, actor, songwriter and producer
1961 – Lynne Jolitz, American computer scientist and programmer
  1961   – Clive Nolan, English musician, composer and producer 
1962 – Tony Fernández, Dominican baseball player  (d. 2020)
  1962   – Julianne Regan, English singer-songwriter and guitarist
1963 – Olha Bryzhina, Ukrainian sprinter
  1963   – Rupert Graves, English actor, director, and screenwriter
  1963   – Yngwie Malmsteen, Swedish guitarist and songwriter 
1964 – Alexandra, Countess of Frederiksborg
  1964   – Mark Waters, American director and producer
1965 – Steve Duchesne, Canadian-American ice hockey player and coach
  1965   – Cho Jae-hyun, South Korean actor
  1965   – Anna Levandi, Russian figure skater and coach
  1965   – Gary Pallister, English footballer and sportscaster
  1965   – Mitch Richmond, American basketball player
1966 – Mike Tyson, American boxer and actor
1967 – Patrik Bodén, Swedish javelin thrower
  1967   – David Busst, English footballer and manager
  1967   – Victoria Kaspi, American-Canadian astrophysicist and academic
1968 – Phil Anselmo, American singer-songwriter and producer 
1969 – Sanath Jayasuriya, Sri Lankan cricketer and politician
  1969   – Uta Rohländer, German sprinter
  1969   – Sébastien Rose, Canadian director and screenwriter
1970 – Brian Bloom, American actor and screenwriter
  1970   – Antonio Chimenti, Italian footballer and manager
  1970   – Mark Grudzielanek, American baseball player and manager
1971 – Monica Potter, American actress
1972 – Sandra Cam, Belgian swimmer
1973 – Chan Ho Park, South Korean baseball player
  1973   – Frank Rost, German footballer and manager
1974 – Hezekiél Sepeng, South African runner
1975 – James Bannatyne, New Zealand footballer
  1975   – Ralf Schumacher, German race car driver
1978 – Ben Cousins, Australian footballer
  1978   – Patrick Ivuti, Kenyan runner
  1978   – Claudio Rivalta, Italian footballer
1979 – Sylvain Chavanel, French cyclist
1980 – Rade Prica, Swedish footballer
  1980   – Seyi Olofinjana, Nigerian footballer
  1980   – Ryan ten Doeschate, Dutch cricketer
1981 – Can Artam, Turkish race car driver
  1981   – Matt Kirk, Canadian football player
  1981   – Barbora Špotáková, Czech javelin thrower
  1981   – Ben Utecht, American football player
1982 – Lizzy Caplan, American actress
  1982   – Ignacio Carrasco, Mexican footballer 
1983 – Marcus Burghardt, German cyclist
  1983   – Katherine Ryan, UK-based Canadian comedian and presenter
  1983   – Cheryl, English singer and TV personality
1984 – Fantasia Barrino, American singer-songwriter and actress
  1984   – Tunku Ismail Idris, Crown Prince of Johor, Malaysia
1985 – Trevor Ariza, American basketball player
  1985   – Michael Phelps, American swimmer
  1985   – Cody Rhodes, American wrestler              
  1985   – Fabiana Vallejos, Argentinian footballer
1986 – Alicia Fox, American wrestler, model, and actress
  1986   – Fredy Guarín, Colombian footballer
  1986   – Nicola Pozzi, Italian footballer
  1986   – Allegra Versace, Italian-American businesswoman
1987 – Ryan Cook, American baseball player
  1987   – Andrew Hedgman, New Zealand runner
1988 – Elisa Jordana, American singer-songwriter, radio and TV personality
1989 – Asbel Kiprop, Kenyan runner
  1989   – Steffen Liebig, German rugby player
  1989   – David Myers, Australian footballer
1997 – Reuben Garrick, Australian rugby league player
1998 – Tom Davies, English footballer

Deaths

Pre-1600
 350 – Nepotianus, Roman ruler 
 710 – Erentrude, Frankish abbess
888 – Æthelred, archbishop of Canterbury
1181 – Hugh de Kevelioc, 5th Earl of Chester, Welsh politician (b. 1147)
1224 – Adolf of Osnabrück, German monk and bishop (b. 1185)
1278 – Pierre de la Broce, French courtier
1337 – Eleanor de Clare, English noblewoman (b. 1290)
1364 – Arnošt of Pardubice, Czech archbishop (b. 1297)
1538 – Charles II, Duke of Guelders (b. 1467)
1522 – Johann Reuchlin, German humanist and Hebrew scholar (b. 1455)

1601–1900
1607 – Caesar Baronius, Italian cardinal and historian (b. 1538)
1649 – Simon Vouet, French painter (b. 1590)
1660 – William Oughtred, English minister and mathematician (b. 1575)
1666 – Alexander Brome, English poet and playwright (b. 1620)
1670 – Henrietta of England (b. 1644)
1704 – John Quelch, English pirate (b. 1665)
1708 – Tekle Haymanot I of Ethiopia (b. 1684)
1709 – Edward Lhuyd, Welsh botanist, linguist, and geographer (b. 1660)
1785 – James Oglethorpe, English general and politician, 1st Colonial Governor of Georgia (b. 1696)
1796 – Abraham Yates Jr., American lawyer and politician (b. 1724)
1857 – Alcide d'Orbigny, French zoologist and paleontologist (b. 1802)
1882 – Charles J. Guiteau, American preacher and lawyer, assassin of James A. Garfield (b. 1841)
  1882   – Alberto Henschel, German-Brazilian photographer and businessman (b. 1827)
1890 – Samuel Parkman Tuckerman, American organist and composer (b. 1819)

1901–present
1908 – Thomas Hill, American painter (b. 1829)
1913 – Alphonse Kirchhoffer, French fencer (b. 1873)
1916 – Eunice Eloisae Gibbs Allyn, American correspondent, author, and poet (b. 1847) 
1917 – Antonio de La Gándara, French painter and illustrator (b. 1861)
  1917   – Dadabhai Naoroji, Parsi intellectual, educator, cotton trader, and an early Indian political and social leader (b. 1825)
1919 – John William Strutt, 3rd Baron Rayleigh, English physicist and academic, Nobel Prize laureate (b. 1842)
1932 – Bruno Kastner, German actor, producer, and screenwriter (b. 1890)
1934 – Karl Ernst, German soldier (b. 1904)
  1934   – Erich Klausener, German soldier and politician (b. 1885)
  1934   – Gustav Ritter von Kahr, German lawyer and politician, Minister-President of Bavaria (b. 1862)
  1934   – Gregor Strasser, German lieutenant and politician (b. 1892)
  1934   – Kurt von Schleicher, German general and politician, 23rd Chancellor of Germany (b. 1882)
1941 – Yefim Fomin, Belarusian politician (b. 1909)
  1941   – Aleksander Tõnisson, Estonian general and politician, 5th Estonian Minister of War (b. 1875)
1948 – Prince Sabahaddin, Turkish-Swiss sociologist and academic (b. 1879)
1949 – Édouard Alphonse James de Rothschild, French financier and polo player (b. 1868)
1951 – Yrjö Saarela, Finnish wrestler and coach (b. 1884)
1953 – Elsa Beskow, Swedish author and illustrator (b. 1874)
  1953   – Charles William Miller, Brazilian footballer and civil servant (b. 1874)
1954 – Andrass Samuelsen, Faroese politician, 1st Prime Minister of the Faroe Islands (b. 1873)
1956 – Thorleif Lund, Norwegian actor (b. 1880) 
1959 – José Vasconcelos, Mexican philosopher and politician (b. 1882)
1961 – Lee de Forest, American inventor, invented the audion tube (b. 1873)
1966 – Giuseppe Farina, Italian race car driver (b. 1906)
  1966   – Margery Allingham, English author of detective fiction (b. 1904)
1968 – Ernst Marcus, German zoologist (b. 1893)
1971 – Georgi Asparuhov, Bulgarian footballer (b. 1943)
  1971   – Herbert Biberman, American director and screenwriter (b. 1900)
  1971   – Georgy Dobrovolsky Ukrainian pilot and astronaut (b. 1928)
  1971   – Nikola Kotkov, Bulgarian footballer (b. 1938)
  1971   – Viktor Patsayev, Kazakh engineer and astronaut (b. 1933)
  1971   – Vladislav Volkov, Russian engineer and astronaut (b. 1935)
1973 – Nancy Mitford, English journalist and author (b. 1904)
  1973   – Vasyl Velychkovsky, Ukrainian-Canadian bishop and martyr (b. 1903)
1974 – Alberta Williams King, Civil rights activist (b. 1904)
1976 – Firpo Marberry, American baseball player and umpire (b. 1898)
1984 – Lillian Hellman, American author and playwright (b. 1905)
1985 – Haruo Remeliik, Palauan politician, 1st President of Palau (b. 1933)
1995 – Georgy Beregovoy, Ukrainian general and astronaut (b. 1921)
  1995   – Gale Gordon, American actor and voice artist (b. 1906)
1996 – Lakis Petropoulos, Greek footballer and manager (b. 1932)
2001 – Chet Atkins, American singer-songwriter, guitarist, and producer (b. 1924)
  2001   – Joe Henderson, American saxophonist and composer (b. 1937)
2002 – Chico Xavier, Brazilian medium and author (b. 1910)
2003 – Buddy Hackett, American actor and comedian (b. 1924)
  2003   – Robert McCloskey, American author and illustrator (b. 1915)
2004 – Eddie Burns, Australian rugby league player (b. 1916)
2007 – Sahib Singh Verma, Indian librarian and politician, 4th Chief Minister of Delhi (b. 1943)
2009 – Pina Bausch, German dancer, choreographer, and director (b. 1940)
  2009   – Harve Presnell, American actor and singer (b. 1933)
2012 – Michael Abney-Hastings, 14th Earl of Loudoun, English-Australian politician (b. 1942)
  2012   – Yitzhak Shamir, Israeli politician, 7th Prime Minister of Israel (b. 1915)
  2012   – Michael J. Ybarra, American journalist and author (b. 1966)
2013 – Alan Campbell, Baron Campbell of Alloway, English lawyer and judge (b. 1917)
  2013   – Akpor Pius Ewherido, Nigerian politician (b. 1963)
  2013   – Kathryn Morrison, American educator and politician (b. 1942)
  2013   – Thompson Oliha, Nigerian footballer (b. 1968)
  2013   – Keith Seaman, Australian politician, 29th Governor of South Australia (b. 1920)
2014 – Frank Cashen, American businessman (b. 1925)
  2014   – Paul Mazursky, American actor, director, producer, and screenwriter (b. 1930)
  2014   – Željko Šturanović, Montenegrin lawyer and politician, 31st Prime Minister of Montenegro (b. 1960)
2015 – Charles W. Bagnal, American general (b. 1934)
  2015   – Robert Dewar, English-American computer scientist and academic (b. 1945)
  2015   – Arthur Porter, Canadian physician and academic (b. 1956)
  2015   – Leonard Starr, American author and illustrator (b. 1925)
2017 – Barry Norman, English television presenter (b. 1933) 
  2017   – Simone Veil, French lawyer and politician (b. 1927)
2018 – Smoke Dawg, Canadian rapper (b. 1996)
2021 – Raj Kaushal, Indian Film Director and Producer (b. 1971)
2022 – Technoblade, American YouTuber and streamer (b. 1999)

Holidays and observances
 Christian feast day:
 Martial
 Theobald of Provins
 First Martyrs of the Church of Rome
 June 30 (Eastern Orthodox liturgics)
 Armed Forces Day (Guatemala)
 Asteroid Day (International observance)
 General Prayer Day (Central African Republic)
 Independence Day (Democratic Republic of the Congo), celebrates the independence of Democratic Republic of the Congo from Belgium in 1960.
 Navy Day (Israel)
 Philippine–Spanish Friendship Day (Philippines)
 Revolution Day (Sudan)
 Teachers' Day (Dominican Republic)

Notes

References

External links

 
 
 

Days of the year
June